Doug Cooper (born June 5, 1970, Douglas Allan Cooper) is an American writer of literary fiction. His debut novel, Outside In, won the 2014 International Book Award for Literary Fiction, 2014 USA Best Book Award for Literary Fiction, and a 2015 Bronze IPPY from the Independent Publisher Book Awards.

Personal life
Cooper grew up in Port Clinton, Ohio, graduating from Port Clinton High School second in his class in 1988 and was the quarterback and captain of the football team, captain of the basketball team, and earned all-conference honors in the Sandusky Bay Conference. He has a Bachelor of Science in Mathematics Education from Miami University and a Master of Arts in American Studies from Saint Louis University. He has traveled to more than twenty countries on five continents, exploring the contradictions between what people believe and how people act in the pursuit of truth, beauty, and love. He has also called Cleveland, St. Louis, Detroit, New York City, and Oslo, Norway home.

Work
Cooper is often asked if his work is autobiographical. In response to this, he has said, "I am definitely asked that a lot, but I did it intentionally. It's another way I am having fun with the writing. Most first novels are autobiographical or are written as memoirs. Although some of the events are similar to those in my life, everything that happens in "Outside In" is there for a reason and has many layers of meaning. I decided to put in some details from my own life and let people run with it. If they want to read it as my life story, that's up to them. I'm not saying a lot of things in the book never happened, but I'll never say which did and did not. (Laughs.) But that's what the whole book is about—the duality of all things. Much of what appears on the surface of "Outside In" is a mask concealing a much deeper and sometimes opposite meaning. "Outside In" is more about the beliefs and experiences the reader brings. One reader may perceive a quote as a kernel of wisdom and another view it as hackneyed. This is all done purposely and very much figures in to how the ending is interpreted."

In his blog, Cooper explains he uses four types of research in crafting a novel: empirical, repurposed, academic, and inventive:

Cooper has appeared at the West Hollywood Book Fair, appearing on a drug fiction panel with Jerry Stahl and Mark Haskell Smith, the Vegas Valley Book Festival, and the Books by the Banks in Cincinnati, Ohio. He often does book signings and readings at stores and cafes and is a frequent guest on podcasts and radio shows.

Bibliography
Outside In (2013)

References

External links
Official website of Doug Cooper

1970 births
21st-century American novelists
Alternative literature
American satirists
Miami University alumni
Living people
American male novelists
American expatriates in Norway
21st-century American male writers
People from Sandusky, Ohio
People from Port Clinton, Ohio
21st-century American non-fiction writers
American male non-fiction writers